Arthur Ernst Glasewald (1861–1926) was a book seller and later stamp dealer in Gössnitz near Leipzig who was a pioneer in the study of German private posts. He founded the Internationale Verein für Localmarkenkunde and was editor and publisher of the journal Neueste Privatpost-Nachrichten. He was joint author and publisher of the Handbuch der deutschen Privatpostmarken.

Glasewald Medal
In 1928, a trust fund was established in memory of Glasewald to award a medal for meritorious research into the history of the German private posts.

Some of the past winners of the medal have been:
Heinrich Düsterbehn (1950)
Georg Glasewald (1951)
Paul Rampacher (1955)
L.N. & M. Williams (1961)
Hans Meier zu Eissen (1982)
Horst Müller (1994)
Ralph Phillips (2016)

Selected publications
Handbuch der deutschen Privatpostmarken (published and edited) 
Die Postwerthzeichen von Griechenland: Nach den neuesten Forschungen . 1896.

References 

1861 births
1926 deaths
German philatelists
Stamp dealers
Philately of Germany
Philatelic awards
German booksellers